Dr. Ernest Friedman-Hill is a principal member of the technical staff at Sandia National Laboratories. They are located in Livermore, California.  

Friedman-Hill is the author of Jess, the rule engine for the Java platform, which was first written in 1995. He is also a teacher of Java programming at two campuses in California.

External links
Jess
Sandia National Laboratories

American computer programmers
Year of birth missing (living people)
Living people
Sandia National Laboratories people
Place of birth missing (living people)